The Marketing Accountability Standards Board (MASB), authorized by the Marketing Accountability Foundation, is an independent, private sector, self-governing group of academics and practitioners that establishes marketing measurement and accountability standards intended for continuous improvement in financial performance, and for the guidance and education of users of performance and financial information.

History 
Establishment of the Board (i.e., MASB) was recommended by The Boardroom Project (2004–2007) in response to growing demand for marketing accountability.

The Boardroom Project found that marketing has been relegated to the “default” category (control costs) because it lacks metrics that reliably tie activities and costs to financial return. While issues surrounding metrics and accountability were not being ignored, practices were too narrowly focused, lacked integration,  and were not predictably tied to financial return. The Boardroom Project considered that measurement standards are essential for efficient and effective functioning of a marketing-driven business because decisions about allocation of resources and assessment of results rely on credible, valid, transparent, and understandable information, and that consistent standards across industries and domains, developed by a transparent process, will be necessary to improve the situation.

As  was true for manufacturing and product quality with the ISO and ANSI standards, and for accounting & financial reporting with the FASB & IASB, The Boardroom Project identified the need for an industry-level authority to establish standards and ensure their continuing relevancy. They considered that the development of generally accepted common standards for measurement and measurement processes would enhance the credibility of the marketing profession, improve the effectiveness and efficiency of marketing activities, guide continuous improvement, and enable marketing to move from discretionary business expense to board-level strategic investment.

Mission 
The Mission of MASB is to “Establish marketing measurement and accountability standards across industry and domain for continuous improvement in financial performance and for the guidance and education of business decision makers and users of performance and financial information.”

Role 
MASB sets standards and processes for evaluating marketing measurement to ensure credibility, validity, transparency, and understanding.
The Board does not endorse specific measures. Rather, it documents how measures stack up against the Marketing Metric Audit Protocol (MMAP). The intention is that the market will select specific measures based on these evaluations. The Board's Dynamic Marketing Metrics Catalogue is intended to be the primary vehicle for documentation and publication.

The Board also intends to demonstrate how to use ideal measures according to MMAP for specific marketing activities, such as TV, on-line advertising,  or other specialized activities and areas. The Board also investigates practices underlying the development and management of ideal measures as well as  practices utilized to create knowledge, determine causality, and apply the findings to process management for improved return.

Projects 
The work of the MASB is conducted on a project basis, including the overall categories of standards, research, and concepts. Selection of priorities is based on pervasiveness of the issue, alternative solutions, technical feasibility, and resources, as well as practical consequences, convergence possibilities, and cooperative opportunities. Projects on the agenda were recommended by its charter members, with feedback from C-Level interviews. (See these links for an up-to-date list of projects: completed, underway, and ready for industry feedback.)

Marketing Metric Audit Protocol (MMAP) 

The Marketing Metric Audit Protocol (MMAP) is a formal process for connecting marketing activities to the financial performance of the firm.

The process includes the conceptual linking of marketing activities to intermediate marketing outcome metrics to cash flow drivers of the business, as well as the validation and causality characteristics of an ideal metric. Cash flow both short-term and over time is the ultimate metric to which all activities of a business enterprise, including marketing, should be causally linked through the validation of intermediate marketing measures; therefore the process of validating the intermediate outcome measures against short-term and long-term cash flow drivers is necessary to forecast  and improve the return.

MMAP Metric Profiles 
MMAP Metric Profiles is a catalogue of marketing metrics documenting the psychometric properties of the measures and giving specific information about reliability, validity, range of use, sensitivity, particularly in terms of validity and sensitivity with respect to financial criteria. This is intended to remedy a situation where most commercial providers offer little detail about their measures, with most publicly available information focusing on integrated suites of products and services with little technical information.

The Metrics Catalogue is provided on the MASB website as metric providers undergo the audit and their offerings are profiled according to MMAP.

Marketing Accountability Foundation 
The Marketing Accountability Foundation (MAF) is the independent, private sector, self-governing organization that oversees the activities of the Board. It provides oversight, administration and funding for its standards-setting Board (MASB) and its Advisory Council (MAC) and selects the MASB Directors and MAC Advisors. It is authorized by its constituency to establish and improve marketing measurement and accountability standards, educate constituents about those standards, and protect the independence and integrity of the standards-setting process. The Foundation is incorporated exclusively for charitable, educational, scientific, and literary purposes within the meaning of Section 501(c) (3) of the Internal Revenue Code. Sources of funding include membership dues, projects, workshops, technical services, publications, and training, advisory and auditing services.

Membership 
Membership is organization-based, and open to marketers, business schools, measurement (modeling and software) providers, media providers, media and advertising agencies, industry associations, and independent consultants.

References

External links 
 MASB Official Website

Marketing organizations